Haute Loue (French meaning the Upper Loue) is a river in the Dordogne department of France. It is a tributary of the Loue, which is a tributary of the Isle.

The source of the river is in the commune of Angoisse. It empties into the Loue southwest of Lanouaille.

References

Rivers of Dordogne
Rivers of Nouvelle-Aquitaine
Rivers of France